The 2020 season is Cerezo Osaka's fourth consecutive season in the top-division of Japanese football following promotion in 2016. In addition to the J1 League, the club also competes in the 2020 Emperor's Cup and the 2020 J.League Cup.

Squad

Senior team
As of 23 February 2020.

Out on loan

Last updated 11 July 2019.

Under-23 Squad

Competitions

J1 League

Table

Results summary

Results by matchday

Matches

Emperor's Cup

J.League Cup

Group stage

Statistics

Goal scorers

Clean sheets

References

External links
 J.League official site

Cerezo Osaka
Cerezo Osaka seasons